See also Robert Jelinek (artist), Robert Jelinek (musician).
Robert Thomas Jelinek (born 20 September 1969 in Solna, Sweden) is a Swedish actor.

Selected filmography
1987 – Stockholmsnatt
1988 – PS Sista sommaren
1998 – Beck – Vita nätter
1999 – Dödlig drift
2000 – Naken
2006 – Emblas hemlighet (TV)
2007 – Gynekologen i Askim (TV)
2007 – Labyrint (TV)
2007 – Arn – The Knight Templar
2009 – Wallander – Prästen

References

External links

1969 births
Swedish male actors
People from Solna Municipality
Living people
20th-century Swedish people
21st-century Swedish people